Oregocerata colossa is a species of moth of the family Tortricidae that is endemic to Venezuela.

The ground colour of the forewings is whitish, sprinkled with greyish rust (especially in the dorsal half of the wing) and with pinkish grey in the terminal third and at the costa. The hindwings are greyish cream, but whiter towards the base and densely strigulated with cream grey.

Etymology
The species name refers to the size of adult and is derived from Greek colossos (meaning gigantic).

References

External links

Moths described in 2006
Endemic fauna of Venezuela
Tortricidae of South America
Euliini
Moths of South America